Korey Dean Hall (born August 5, 1983) is a former fullback in the National Football League (NFL). He was selected by the Green Bay Packers in the sixth round in the 2007 NFL Draft, the 191st overall pick, and went on to win Super Bowl XLV with the team over the Pittsburgh Steelers. He played college football for Boise State and high school football in Glenns Ferry, Idaho.

Hall was also a member of the New Orleans Saints and Arizona Cardinals.

Early years
Born in Mountain Home, Idaho, Hall grew up in nearby Glenns Ferry and played high school football at Glenns Ferry High School in Idaho. He played both linebacker and running back for the Pilots and was named the Class 2A Player of the Year in 2001.

College career
Hall played at Boise State University where he was a three-time 1st team All-Western Athletic Conference (WAC) linebacker and two-time WAC Special Teams player of the year and WAC Defensive player of the year. He majored in construction management while at Boise State.

Professional career

Green Bay Packers
Hall was selected by the Green Bay Packers in the sixth round of the 2007 NFL Draft, the 191st overall pick. The Packers moved him to fullback with the hope that he would make an impact on special teams. 

Hall scored his first and only NFL touchdown on a one-yard pass from quarterback Aaron Rodgers on September 8, 2008, in a Monday night game against the Minnesota Vikings. It was Rodgers' first career touchdown as a starter in the NFL. 

During Hall's fourth and final season in Green Bay, the Packers made the playoffs as a wild card team and won four straight games on the road, including Super Bowl XLV. He had one reception for two yards in the Super Bowl.

New Orleans Saints
On July 29, 2011, Hall joined the New Orleans Saints.

Arizona Cardinals
Hall signed with the Arizona Cardinals on September 25, 2012. However, three days later, he was moved to the reserve/retired list.

Post-NFL life 
Hall is now a construction manager in Boise, Idaho.

References

External links
 Green Bay Packers: bio
 Boise State Broncos: bio
 

1983 births
Living people
People from Glenns Ferry, Idaho
Players of American football from Idaho
American football fullbacks
American football linebackers
Boise State Broncos football players
Green Bay Packers players
New Orleans Saints players
Arizona Cardinals players
People from Mountain Home, Idaho